Kabelo may refer to:

 Kabelo Mmono, Batswana high jumper
 Kabelo Kgosiemang, Batswana high jumper
 Kabelo Mabalane, South African rapper
 Kabelo Secondary School, a state school located in Polokwane, South Africa

Surnames of Botswana
Surnames of African origin